Darai Nur or Dara-i Noor (Pashto/Persian/Pashayi: دره نور) is a district in the north of Nangarhar Province, Afghanistan. Its population was estimated at 120,000 in 2002, of whom 28,000 were children under 12. The dominant language in the district is Pashayi and Pashto.

The district centre is the village of Darai Nur. There are nine major villages and many smaller ones in the district. Some of the well-known villages in Darai Nur are Amla, Barkot, Khewa, Qalai Shahi, Sutan Lam, Nur Gal, and Kashmund.

References

 UNHCR District Profile, dated 2002-04-30, accessed 2006-07-07 (PDF).

External links
 Map of Dara-i-Nur district (PDF)

Districts of Nangarhar Province